The WXW Heavyweight Championship is the top professional wrestling title in the World Xtreme Wrestling promotion. It was created in 1996 as the WSWF Heavyweight Championship under WXW's original name, the World Star Wrestling Federation. The promotion renamed to its current name in 1998, and the title followed suit. The title history prior to January 10, 1997 is unknown, but there are 43 recognized known champions with a total of 69 title reigns.

Title history

|-
!1
|Bam Bam Bigelow
|1997
|House show
| −
|1
|N/A
|align="left"|The exact date and loss of the title are uncertain.
|
|-
!2
|Headshrinker Samu
|1997
|House show
| −
|1
|30
|align="left"|The exact date and loss of the title are uncertain.
|
|-
!3
|The Hungarian Barbarian
|December 10, 1997
|Top Rope/WSWF
|Freeland, PA
|1
|
|align="left"|The exact date and loss of the title are uncertain.
|
|-
!4
|Jak Molsonn
|January 10, 1998
|Top Rope/WSWF
|Freeland, PA
|1
|
|align="left"|
|
|-
!5
|Jake Molsonn
|April 9, 1998
| −
|Hazleton, PA
|1
|
|align="left"|
|
|-
!6
|John Rambo
|August 27, 1998
|Top Rope/WSWF Channel 13 TV Taping
|Harrisburg, PA
|1
|
|align="left"|The exact date when Rambo vacated the title is uncertain.
|
|-

|-
!7
|Headshrinker Samu
|April 24, 1999
|House show
|Hazleton, PA
|2
|
|align="left"|Defeated The Mad Russian to win the vacant title.
|
|-
!8
|The Hungarian Barbarian
|September 18, 1999
|House show
|Hazleton, PA
|2
|
|align="left"|
|
|-
!9
|Jake Daniels
|October 6, 1999
|House show
|Hazleton, PA
|2
|
|align="left"|Jake Daniels was formerly known as Jake Molsonn.
|
|-
!10
|Jak Molsonn
|October 30, 1999
|House show
|Hazleton, PA
|2
|
|align="left"|Defeated Oxx Hogg who substituted Jake Daniels and The Hungarian Barbarian in a three–way match
|
|-
!11
|Chicago Heat
|January 4, 2000
|House show
|Plymouth, PA
|1
|
|align="left"|
|
|-
!12
|Jak Molsonn
|January 22, 2000
|House show
|Hazleton, PA
|3
|
|align="left"|
|
|-
!13
|Sugaa
|February 19, 2000
|House show
|Hazleton, PA
|1
|
|align="left"|This was a fatal four–way match ladder match also involving The Inferno Kid and L.A. Smooth
|
|-
!14
|Shane Black
|June 2, 2000
|House show
|Hazleton, PA
|1
|<1
|align="left"|Sugaa's WXW Cruiserweight Championship was also on the line in this match. Shane Black became the first person to hold both WXW Cruiserweight and WXW World Heavyweight Championships.
|
|-

|-
!15
|Sugaa
|June 3, 2000
|House show
|Allentown, PA
|2
|
|align="left"|Sugaa defeated Shane Black to win both titles. Sugaa held the Cruiserweight title until July 6, when he exceeded the cruiserweight division weight limit.
|
|-
!16
|Salvatore Bellomo
|September 16, 2000
|WXW Live TV
|Hazleton, PA
|1
|
|align="left"|This was a three–way match also involving Sugaa and The Hungarian Barbarian.
|
|-
!17
|Headshrinker Samu
|January 9, 2001
|House show
|Allentown, PA
|3
|
|align="left"|
|
|-
!18
|Dylan Dean
|May 27, 2001
|WXW Memorial Day Madness 2001
|Allentown, PA
|1
|
|align="left"|
|
|-
!19
|The Metal Maniac
|June 17, 2001
|WXW TV Taping
|Allentown, PA
|1
|<1
|align="left"|Awarded the title by Dylan Dean.
|
|-
!20
|Headshrinker Samu
|June 17, 2001
|House show
|Allentown, PA
|4
|
|align="left"|
|
|-

|-
!21
|Headshrinker Samu
|October 21, 2001
|House show
|Allentown, PA
|5
|
|align="left"|WXW Commissioner Lotto Money returned the title to Samu, because he was never defeated for it.
|
|-
!22
|Sugaa
|March 2, 2002
|House show
|Hazleton, PA
|3
|
|align="left"|This was a fans bring the weapons match.
|
|-
!23
|Afa Anoa'i Jr.
|June 22, 2002
|WXW Sportsfest 2002
|Hazleton, PA
|1
|
|align="left"|
|
|-

|-
!24
|Billy Dream
|July 11, 2003
|WXW Sportsfest 2003
|Allentown, PA
|1
|
|align="left"|This was a 20-man battle royal. Dream lastly eliminated Mana The Polonesian Warrior to win the vacant title.
|
|-
!25
|Gene Snitsky
|October 19, 2003
|House show
|Sciota, PA
|1
|
|align="left"|This was a last man standing match.
|
|-
!26
|Mana The Polynesian Warrior
|March 28, 2004
|House show
|Mountainville, PA
|1
|
|align="left"|
|
|-
!27
|Rapid Fire Maldonado
|May 29, 2004
|House show
|Sciota, PA
|1
|
|align="left"|
|
|-
!28
|Mana The Polynesian Warrior
|July 9, 2004
|WXW Sportsfest 2004
|Allentown, PA
|2
|
|align="left"|
|
|-
!29
|Sinister X
|October 29, 2004
|WXW Halloween Mayhem 2004
|Sciota, PA
|1
|
|align="left"|This was a three–way match also involving L.A. Smooth.
|
|-
!30
|Jeff Coleman
|November 21, 2004
|House show
|Sciota, PA
|1
|
|align="left"|
|
|-

|-
!31
|Johnny Bravado
|February 72, 2005
|House show
|Allentown, PA
|1
|
|align="left"|This was a "whirlwind" match.
|
|-
!32
|Rockin' Rebel
|May 29, 2005
|House show
|Bushkill, PA
|1
|
|align="left"|
|
|-
!33
|Johnny Bravado
|July 8, 2005
|House show
|Allentown, PA
|2
|
|align="left"|
|
|-
!34
|Havoc
|November 12, 2005
|House show
|Allentown, PA
|1
|
|align="left"|
|
|-
!35
|Headshrinker Samu
|March 9, 2005
|House show
|Allentown, PA
|6
|
|align="left"|
|
|-
!36
|Rage
|April 15, 2007
|House show
|Allentown, PA
|1
|
|align="left"|
|
|-
!37
|Headshrinker Samu
|June 2, 2007
|House show
|Allentown, PA
|7
|
|align="left"|The exact length of the reign is uncertain.
|
|-
!38
|Sugaa
|March 5, 2008
|House show
|Minneola, FL
|4
|
|align="left"|The exact length of the reign is uncertain.
|
|-
!39
|Dylan Night
|September 26, 2009
|WXW 1 Year In Florida Anniversary 
|Minneola, FL
|1
|
|align="left"|
|
|-
!40
|Sugaa
|January 30, 2010
|House show
|Minneola, FL
|5
|
|align="left"|
|
|-
!41
|Dylan Night
|February 20, 2010
|House show
|Minneola, FL
|2
|
|align="left"|Dylan Night defeated Sugaa in the first ever Loser Leaves WXW Last Man Standing match to win the title.
|
|-
!42
|Nick Nero
|May 1, 2010
|House show
|Minneola, FL
|1
|
|align="left"|
|
|-
!43
|The Perfect Creation
|May 22, 2010
|House show
|Minneola, FL
|1
|
|align="left"| This was a three–way match also involving  CJ O'Doyle.
|
|-
!44
|Mark Silva
|September 11, 2010
|House show
|Minneola, FL
|1
|
|align="left"| This was a three–way match also involving Nick Folie.
|
|-
!45
|Richard J. Criado
|October 23, 2010
|WXW Halloween Extravaganza 2010
|Minneola, FL
|2
|
|align="left"|Criado was formerly known as The Perfect Creation.
|
|-
!46
|Dylan Night
|January 15, 2011
|House show
|Minneola, FL
|3
|
|align="left"|
|
|-
!47
|Mark Silva
|February 12, 2011
|House show
|Minneola, FL
|2
|
|align="left"|
|
|-
!48
|Bryan Maddox
|December 17, 2011
|House show
|Minneola, FL
|1
|
|align="left"|
|
|-
!49
|Sean Maluta
|June 16, 2012
|House show
|Minneola, FL
|1
|
|align="left"|
|
|-
!50
|Bryan Maddox 
|January 26, 2013
|House show
|Minneola, FL
|2
|
|align="left"|
|
|-
!51
|Nick Nero
|May 11, 2013
|House show
|Minneola, FL
|2
|
|align="left"|The exact length of the reign is uncertain.
|
|-
!52
|Bryan Maddox 
|June 11, 2013
|House show
|Minneola, FL
|3
|
|align="left"|The exact length of the reign is uncertain.
|
|-
!53
|Noah Kekoa
|September 11, 2013
|WXW C4
|Minneola, FL
|1
|
|align="left"|The exact length of the reign is uncertain.
|
|-
!54
|Sean Maluta
|May 9, 2014
|House show
|Minneola, FL
|2
|
|align="left"|
|
|-

|-
!55
|Mark Silva
|December 20, 2014
|House show
|Minneola, FL
|3
|
|align="left"|
|
|-
!56
|Sugaa
|January 31, 2015
|House show
|Minneola, FL
|6
|
|align="left"|
|
|-
!57
|Irish Jack
|April 12, 2015
|WXW Xtreme War
|Minneola, FL
|1
|
|align="left"|
|
|-
!58
|Mr. NYR
|July 11, 2015
|House show
|Minneola, FL
|1
|<1
|align="left"|
|
|-
!59
|ERA
|July 11, 2015
|House show
|Minneola, FL
|1
|
|align="left"|
|
|-
!60
|Jaxen Blade
|November 7, 2015
|House show
|Minneola, FL
|1
|
|align="left"|
|
|-
!61
|Sean Maluta
|July 30, 2016
|House show
|Minneola, FL
|3
|
|align="left"|
|
|-
!62
|D. Ramos
|August 1, 2017
|House show
|Minneola, FL
|1
|
|align="left"|The exact length of the reign is uncertain.
|
|-
!63
|The Beast
|August 5, 2017
|House show
|Minneola, FL
|1
|
|align="left"|
|
|-
!64
|Jorel Ganzy
|October 21, 2017
|House show
|Minneola, FL
|1
|
|align="left"|
|
|-
!65
|D. Ramos
|February 3, 2018
|House show
|Minneola, FL
|2
|
|align="left"|
|
|-
!66
|Deathrow Jethro
|May 19, 2018
|WXW Doomsday
|Minneola, FL
|1
|N/A
|align="left"|
|
|-
!67
|D3
|2019
|–
|Florida, USA
|1
|N/A
|align="left"|
|
|-
!68
|D. Ramos
|September 28, 2019
|WXW Slam Jam
|Minneola, Florida
|3
|84
|align="left"|
|
|-
!69
|Chico Adams
|December 21, 2019
|WXW Winter Warfare 2019
|Minneola, Florida
|1
|+
|align="left"|Defeated previous champion D. Ramos, D3 and Vertigo in fatal four-way match 
|
|-

Combined reigns

See also
 WXW C4 Ultimate Heavyweight Championship

References

External links
WXW Heavyweight Championship History at Cagematch - The Internet Wrestling Database

Heavyweight wrestling championships
World Xtreme Wrestling championships